1-Naphthalenethiol is an organosulfur compound with the formula C10H7SH.  It is a white solid.  It is one of two monothiols of naphthalene, the other being 2-naphthalenethiol.

Synthesis
A practical synthesis involves the tin/HCl-reduction of the naphthalene-1-sulfonyl chloride.
1-Naphthalenethiol can also be prepared from 1-bromonaphthalene by Pd-catalyzed reaction with the silylthiolate iPr3SiSK followed by hydrolysis of the silathioether.  It was first prepared from the Grignard reagent generated from 1-bromonaphthalene.  Treatment of that reagent with elemental sulfur followed by acidification gave the compound. It has been produced by the iodine-catalyzed reduction of 1-naphthalenesulfonic acid with triphenylphosphine.

Reactions
Treating 1-naphthalenethiol with butyl lithium in the presence of tmeda affords the 2-lithio derivative.

References

Thiols
1-Naphthyl compounds
Foul-smelling chemicals